The 2014–15 Kentucky Wildcats women's basketball team represented University of Kentucky during the 2014–15 NCAA Division I women's basketball season. The Wildcats, led by eighth year head coach Matthew Mitchell, play their home games at the Memorial Coliseum with one game at Rupp Arena and were members of the Southeastern Conference. They finished the season 24–10, 10–6 in SEC play to finish in a three way tie for fourth place. They advanced to the semifinals of the SEC women's tournament where they lost to Tennessee. They received an at-large to the NCAA women's tournament where they defeated Tennessee State in the first before getting upset by Dayton the second round.

Roster

Schedule

|-
!colspan=9 style="background:#273BE2; color:white;"| Exhibition

|-
!colspan=9 style="background:#273BE2; color:white;"| Non-conference Regular Season

|-
!colspan=9 style="background:#273BE2; color:white;"| SEC regular season

|-
!colspan=9 style="text-align: center; background:#273BE2"| SEC Tournament

|-
!colspan=9 style="text-align: center; background:#273BE2"| NCAA Women's tournament

Source

Rankings

See also
2014–15 Kentucky Wildcats men's basketball team

References

Kentucky Wildcats women's basketball seasons
Kentucky
K
Kentucky Wild
Kentucky Wild